Pekel ( or ) is a settlement north of Maribor in northeastern Slovenia. It belongs to the City Municipality of Maribor.

Name
Pekel was attested in written sources circa 1500 as in der Hell. The name is pronounced Pêkel (corresponding to the dialect pronunciation of the common noun pêkel 'Hell') rather than the more standard Pekèl. Across Slovenia there are many oronyms, regional names, and microptoponyms named Pekel. In folk geography, the name was used to metaphorically designate chasms, caves, shafts, and other narrow, dark places; for example, in Kropa there is an oeconym Pekel originally referring to a blacksmith's shop. Semantically related names in Slovenia include Devil's Hole in the settlement of Okrog and Devil's Ravine in the settlement of Parož. See also Pekel, Trebnje, Hell Cave, and Hell Gorge.

References

External links
Pekel on Geopedia

Populated places in the City Municipality of Maribor